Dos Yiddishe Licht (This Jewish/Yiddish light) is the name of two different Haredi publications, that came out in the 20th century. They had a black & white paper cover.

New York, 1923
In 1923, Reb Shraga Feivel Mendlowitz and the Chazzan Yossele Rosenblatt produced Dos Yiddishe Licht, a short-lived English and Yiddish language weekly that included
articles of comment and inspiration. It eventually became a daily but was forced to discontinue publication in 1927, because of financial difficulties. In fact, Chazan Rosenblatt went on a year-long concert tour to pay back
the monies owed to creditors.

Jerusalem, 1950 

Dos Yiddishe Licht was founded by R' Moshe Ehrntal, an activist of the Yishuv haYashan and had his fingerprints.
DYL was formerly one of the only few Kosher Yiddish reading material for children. It was published by "Bnos Yerusheloyim".

2001 as Beleichtungen 
In 2001 it was established in Jerusalem "Dos Yiddisher Licht - Beleichtungen association" (NGO), by David Erenthal, Shlomo Brandwin, Yoel Sheinberger, Akiva Chaim Greenfeld, Jacob Jacob, Amram Katzenelbogen and Chaim Israel Mintzberg, with the following official goals: "Publishing Jewish material in the Yiddish language. Support for Yiddish-speaking institutions and organizations. Promoting the penetration of the Yiddish language into the public consciousness."

Beleichtungen is the newer version of Dos Yiddishe Licht. Unlike its forerunner and umbrella company, it follows a more modern style with a more sophisticated graphic layout. While Dos Yiddishe Licht had a paper cover including only a picture of another jewish leader, Beleichtungen is printed in glossy paper, and in full colored graphic.

External links

References

Ashkenazi Jewish culture in Jerusalem
Haredi Judaism in Jerusalem
Haredi Judaism in New York City
Yiddish periodicals
Yiddish culture in Israel
Yiddish culture in New York City